Joe Bartles Browder (April 10, 1938 – September 18, 2016) was an American environmental activist who spearheaded ongoing efforts to save the Florida Everglades.  He was considered to be a global environmental advocate. He was an advisor on energy, climate change, environmental policy to public-interest groups, foundations, auto and energy companies, other businesses, Native American tribes and government agencies. He started out his career as a television news reporter, an active volunteer and later a paid representative for Audubon (the National Audubon Society).  No one can be credited more, within a non-political conservation establishment, for the national environmental movement taking the country from the first Earth Day to the election of Jimmy Carter, for whom Browder was an early companion in the early days of Florida primary campaigning

Biography
Browder's place of birth is Amarillo, Texas. Browder worked for NBC (Miami, Florida) as a television news report and producer. He was married to Marion Edey and later to Louise Dunlap. He was active in saving the Everglades since 1961 up until his death. He is recognized as being responsible in founding  the Biscayne National Park (1968) and the Big Cypress National Preserve (1974), both in Florida. The Bob Graham Center for Public Service, (Florida Senator), states that Browder "emerged from the grassroots in the early 1960s to help save South Florida’s most precious natural wonders from unrestrained forces of growth." Because of Browder's work in spearheading the creation of the Big Cypress National Preserve, The National Park Service eventually named Browder "Citizen Father of the Big Cypress Preserve". He died at the age of 78 on September 18, 2016, of cancer, in Maryland.

Organizations, affiliations

 National Audubon Society (Officer) – Miami, Florida chapter, Southeaster US Representative (1968–1970)
 Coordinator of the Everglades Coalition (founder)
 Managing Global Issues project – Carnegie Endowment for International Peace
 Conservation Director of Friends of the Earth
 League of Conservation Voters (treasurer)
 Advisory Council of the InterAmerican Water Resources Network
 Mato Gross [Brazil] do Sul Environment Secretary Emiko Kawakmi de Resende (co-chairman).
 Inter-American Dialogue on Water Management – Natural Resources section (Miami, 1993)
 Everglades Coalition (national chair, 1994, 1995)
 Third Inter-American Dialogue on Water Resources (Host Committee member, Panama, 1999)
 World Water Council's Water Vision for the Western Hemisphere program – Water and Indigenous Peoples section. (Panama, 1999).
 René Dubos Center for Human Environments (board member).
 Boards of Friends of the everglades
 Friends of the Big Cypress National Preserve
 Dunlap & Browder – Environmental Consulting Firm

Further biography and environmental activism
As a young man, Browder had received a scholarship in ornithology from Cornell University, but dropped out to get married. Browder had convinced journalist, feminist and environmentalist Marjory Stoneman Douglas who had written the influential book The Everglades: River of Grass in 1947, to start an environmental organization to save the Everglades. That organization became known as Friends of the Everglades, which was created to protest the creation of the Miami International Airport in the Big Cypress portion of the Everglades that Browder was so opposed to. The book An Everglades Providence: Marjory Stoneman Douglas and the American Environmental Century (Environmental History and the American South), quotes Marjory Douglas as one who admired the stamina of the activists, especially Joe Browder, the good soldier of nature who stood on the front lines of each successive battle. Browder himself was inspired by Douglas' book The Everglades: River of Grass for its sobering history, "literary power" and "ethical voice". J. Brooks Flippen, in the book, Conservative Conservationist: Russell E. Train And the Emergence of American Environmentalism, refers to the 1968 Joe Browder as a "young, long-haired environmentalist...typical of the new generation of activists," and states that "most of the established conservation groups hardly welcomed him."

Previously, the chapter of the Audubon Society in Miami, with which Browder was affiliated, had become embroiled in a battle with a developer named Ludwig, who attempted to put an oil refinery in Lower Biscayne Bay. Browder is described by Douglas as the "hardest working" activist in the crusade against Ludwig's refinery. This small victory by conservationists soon led to the more difficult battle previously described and more widely noted, against the International Airport.

Browder secured a federal mandate to prevent water from being diverted from the then-dying Everglades National Park.  Browder conferred with the Nixon administration, and finally with President Richard Nixon, in a successful effort to save the Everglades from encroachment through development of an already commenced project to build a new Miami International Airport, in what is now part of the National Park system in the Everglades. Life magazine, July 4, 1970, states that Browder, along with Miami attorney Daniel Paul, led the battle against the 39 square mile airport, which it refers to as a "great victory" for the conservation effort.  As a result of meeting with Browder, Nixon sent his daughter, Julie Nixon to Miami and the Everglades and to personally report back to him on the situation. Nixon concurred that the loss of this portion of the Everglades would be a "loss for the nation" and supported Browder and Marjory Douglas.

Browder was the political director of Friends of the Earth in Washington, D.C. but split with FOE to form the Environmental Policy Center in 1972. In 1976, he was brought in by Jimmy Carter to assist environmental planning for the Carter-Mondale Policy Planning Office under Jack Watson during the Presidential campaign. He left the Presidential Transition after the election, but when the President-elect was briefed at Blair House on the unit’s work, Carter asked his top aides, “Where’s Joe?” Browder subsequently served as a special assistant to an Assistant Secretary of the Interior and had a role in Carter administration environmental policies.

Browder is referred to in the book The Swamp: The Everglades, Florida, and The Politics of Paradise by Michael Grunwald, as Audubon's "abrasive but effective southeastern representative" who possessed "ferocious intensity". He was known for criticizing fellow environmentalists, which made him something of a pariah among them. He "blasted" presidential candidate, then Vice-President Al Gore over for dragging his feet on the Everglades airport issue. Gore ended up losing the election for presidency over a handful of votes in that state.

In 1997, Browder was appointed professor at the Johns Hopkins University Graduate School of Environmental Sciences, teaching Markets, Competition and the Environment (graduate course).

Present activities
Browder continued to be active in efforts to preserve the Florida Everglades. He was a principal in Dunlap & Browder, Inc. an environmental consulting firm in Washington, DC. He resided in Fairhaven, Anne Arundel County, Maryland.

References

Further reading
The Environmental Destruction of South Florida: A Handbook for Citizens. Ross McCluney. University of Miami Press, 1971.

Nixon and the Environment, Village Voice Books, 1972. Edited by James H. Rathlesberger, Browder’s chapter on White House Decision Making is insightful. 

1938 births
2016 deaths
American environmentalists